Marcin Świetlicki (born 24 December 1961) is a Polish poet, writer, and musician. He lives and works in Kraków, Poland.

Świetlicki was born in Piaski, near Lublin, Poland. He studied Polish Literature at the Jagiellonian University in Kraków, where he has been living since 1980. He worked as an editor at the Tygodnik Powszechny weekly until 2004. Besides his extensive publications and readings as a poet, he also performs as an actor and heads the band Świetliki (Fireflies). Świetlicki has won various prizes and awards for his poetry, including the 1996 Kościelski Award.

External links 
   I find the trace, translated by Peter Constantine
 biography and bibliography at "Culture.PL" website of the Adam Mickiewicz Institute

1961 births
Living people
Polish poets
Polish crime writers
Jagiellonian University alumni
20th-century Polish writers
21st-century Polish writers